Wael Raddad (born in 1979), is a Jordanian novelist, screenwriter and painter of Palestinian origin, the Emirate of Ras al-Khaimah in the United Arab Emirates, his birthplace and residence. He holds a BA in Accounting from Al-Quds Open University. He is considered one of the first and most important writers in Jordan and Palestine in the literature of horror, crime and science fiction. He has published more than 10 novels, and won several competitions, including the Sharjah Theatre Days Competition in theatrical writing for the play “The Fall of the Last Angel”.

Career 
Wael Muhammad Salih Qassem Radad, has been writing fiction since 2009 until now. He was born in Ras al-Khaimah, which is where he resides on October 2, 1979. The majority of his works revolve around the psychological corridors of the characters of his ambiguous novels, sometimes overwhelmed by many audio-visual hallucinations, in an atmosphere Closer to mystery or science fiction.

Fictional publications 

 Raddad published the following books:
 (2009) Clinical Death : Dar Aktub, Lebanon
 (2010) Memoirs of Drowned Rats : Dar Mamdouh Adwan, Syria
 (2010) Symphony of Valley of Shadow : Dar Sinbad for Media and Publishing, Egypt
 (2010) The Funeral of Angel : Novel House, Saudi Arabia
 (2010) Elevator No. 7 : Dar Sama for Publishing and Distribution, Egypt
 (2011) The Follower Guardian :Dar Sama for Publishing and Distribution, Egypt
 (2011) The Demon's Delegate : latinum Book House, Kuwait
 (2012) Infernal Angel: Platinum Book House, Kuwait
 (2013) I will give you sweets on condition that you die : Publications Company, Lebanon
 (2013) The Dark Scenario : Prnce of Nightmares: Dar Sama for Publishing and Distribution, Egypt
 (2013) The Dark Scenario 2 : TheSecret Detective: Dar Sama for Publishing and Distribution, Egypt
 (2016) Al- Majja  (The Shelter) : Dar l-Rawaq for Publishing and Distribution, Egypt
 (2016) My Best Devil : Dar Sma for Publishing and Distribution, Egypt
 (2019) The Naughty Club : Ibeidi Publishing House, Egypt

Achievements 

 He won the Sharjah Days Theater Competition in theatrical composition of the play The Fall of the Last Angel.
 He won the competitions for the children of Sheikh Hazza bin Zayed Al Nahyan for the culture of the Arab child, for the story of the tears of the small body.

Also read 

 Basma Elkholy

References 

1972 births
Living people
Jordanian novelists
Jordanian screenwriters
Jordanian painters